General Council in medieval Scotland was a sister institution to parliament that existed between the late fourteenth century and the early sixteenth century. It has been argued to be almost indistinguishable from parliament, and has always been treated together with parliament by historians. The main difference was that it could be called with less than the statutory 40 days' notice required for parliament and other courts, and, since it was not a court, did not have the final judicial capacity of the senior institution over issues such as forfeiture of life and property for treason. It could and did raise taxation and issued legislation just as important as parliament. In times of royal minority or incapacity it was often preferred to parliament (for instance the reigns of  Robert II, Robert III, the period of captivity of  James I (1406 to 1424), and much of the long minority of  James II (1437 to 1445). In the reign of  James III it seems to have been largely abandoned, even in the minority period of 1466 to 1470 although this may be partly a side effect of its records being separated from the main register of parliament, and subsequently lost. General Councils finally ceased to be held at all in the reign of James IV, shortly before  Conventions of Estates began to be held.

See also
 List of parliaments of Scotland (includes General Councils)

Further reading
 R. J. Tanner, The Late Medieval Scottish Parliament: Politics and the Three Estates, 1424-1488 (East Linton, 2000).
 K. M. Brown and R. J. Tanner, The History of the Scottish Parliament, volume 1: Parliament and Politics in Scotland, 1235 to 1560 (Edinburgh, 2004)

Parliament of Scotland
Institutions of medieval Scotland
Medieval politics